Floridana Beach is an unincorporated community in Brevard County, Florida, United States.  It is located on a barrier island southeast of the city of Melbourne and east of the town of Grant-Valkaria.  It is just south of the unincorporated community of Melbourne Shores, and north of the unincorporated community of Sunnyland Beach.

The community is part of the Palm Bay–Melbourne–Titusville Metropolitan Statistical Area.

References

Unincorporated communities in Brevard County, Florida
Unincorporated communities in Florida
Populated coastal places in Florida on the Atlantic Ocean